The Social Democratic Women in Sweden, or "S-women", is the women's wing of the Swedish Social Democratic Party.

It was established in 1920 by representatives from 120 local Social Democratic women’s clubs from all over Sweden.  At the time of its foundation, there had been local women's clubs of the Party since the foundation of the Stockholms allmänna kvinnoklubb in 1892, but there was no national women's club.  The most important reason for the funding of a national women’s league was to promote and activate women politically, as well as to acquire access to power and provide a political power base for women.

Its chairperson is, since October 2021, Annika Strandhäll.

Chairpersons
Signe Vessman, 1920–1936
Disa Västberg, 1936–1952
Inga Thorsson, 1952–1964
Lisa Mattson, 1964–1981
Maj-Lis Lööw, 1981–1990
Margareta Winberg, 1990–1995
Inger Segelström, 1995–2003
Nalin Pekgul, 2003–2011
Lena Sommestad, 2011–2013
Carina Ohlsson, 2013–2021
Annika Strandhäll, 2021–

See also
 Stockholms allmänna kvinnoklubb

References

External links
(S-women) website

Swedish Social Democratic Party
Women's wings of political parties in Sweden
1920 establishments in Sweden
Organizations established in 1920
Organizations based in Stockholm